Baring Mountain (or Mount Baring), is a peak in the central part of the Cascade Range of Washington, United States.

Baring Mountain was previously known as Mount Index before being renamed in 1917. The peak currently named Mount Index was known as West Index Mountain until that time.

The first recorded ascent of Baring Mountain was on July 28, 1897 by John Charlton and Albert H. Sylvester. However given the nontechnical nature of the easiest ascent route a much earlier Native American ascent is possible. The standard route on the mountain is the Northwest Ridge Route, involving hiking (off-trail, some of it through brush) and a small amount of scrambling at the top.

The northeast aspect of the peak is home to several routes of great length and technical difficulty (up to Grade VI, 5.12b).  The northeast face was first climbed on July 13, 1960 by Ed Cooper and Don Gordon Claunch.

The first BASE jump off Baring Mountain was done by Todd Higley and Josh Whipple, in August 2001. Michael McMurtrey, of Seattle, was the first to jump from Baring using a wingsuit, in June 2004.

References

External links
 
 
 
 

Mountains of King County, Washington
Baring
Mountains of Snohomish County, Washington